Harbacha (Belarusian: Гарба́ха) is an agricultural town in Belarus located in the Ivanava District of the Brest Region.

History 
During the interwar period, it was located in Polesie Voivodeship, Poland. After World War II, it was within the borders of the Soviet Union, and since 1991, in independent Belarus.

On 29 December 2022, a Ukrainian S-300 air defence missile was shot down by the Belarusian authorities, crashing near Harbacha. This occurred following a Russian wave of missile strikes against Ukrainian infrastructure during the Russian invasion of Ukraine. Both sides acknowledged the incident as an accident.

Geography 
It is located 16 kilometers southwest of the city of Ivanava, 156 kilometers from Brest and 11 kilometers from Snitovo.

Demographics 
In 1921, the village had 368 residents, living in 74 buildings, including 248 locals, 109 Poles and 11 Belarusians. 340 residents were Orthodox, 27 Mosaic and 1 Roman Catholic. In 1996, the town had 548 inhabitants and 279 yards. In 2009, the town had 516 inhabitants.

Climate 
The climate in Harbacha is moderate, characterized by warm summers and mild winters, and this region has the warmest climate in the region. Cyclones often pass in winter from the north-west in summer and south or south-west in winter.

References

External sources  
Гарбаха // Беларуская энцыклапедыя: У 18 т. Т. 5: Гальцы — Дагон / Рэдкал.: Г. П. Пашкоў і інш. — Мн. : БелЭн, 1997. — Т. 5. — 576 с. — 10 000 экз. — ISBN 985-11-0035-8. — ISBN 985-11-0090-0 (т. 5). — С. 54.

Towns in Belarus
Populated places in Brest Region
Ivanava District